Tympanotonos is a genus of snail living in brackish water, a gastropod mollusk in the family Potamididae.

Extant and extinct species 
Species within this genus include:
 † Tympanotonus calcaratus (Grateloup, 1840)
 † Tympanotonus conarius (Bayan, 1873)
 Tympanotonos fuscatus  (Linnaeus, 1758) (the only extant species) 
 † Tympanotonus margaritaceum (Brongniart)
 † Tympanotonos redoniensis Van Dingenen, Ceulemans & Landau, 2016 
 † Tympanotonus semperi (Deshaye, 1864) 
 † Tympanotonos stroppus Brongniart 1823

Fossils species within this genus can be found in sediment of Europe, United States, South Africa, Japan, Venezuela and Indonesia from Cretaceous to Quaternary (age range: 84.9 to 0.012 Ma).

References

 Kiel S. (2003) New taxonomic data for the gastropod fauna of the Umzamba Formation (Santonian–Campanian, South Africa); Cretaceous Research 24 (2003) 449–475

External links
 DANIELA ESU and ODOARDO GIROTTI  THE LATE OLIGOCENE MOLLUSCAN FAUNA FROM OTRANTO (APULIA, SOUTHERN ITALY): AN EXAMPLE OF ALTERNATING FRESHWATER, LAGOONAL AND EMERGED ENVIRONMENTS
 Geocities - Potamidae

Potamididae
Extant Cretaceous first appearances